Liga Deportiva Universitaria de Quito's 2019 season was the club's 89th year of existence, the 66th year in professional football, and the 58th in the top level of professional football in Ecuador.

Club

Personnel
President: Guillermo Romero
Honorary President: Rodrigo Paz
President of the Executive Commission: Esteban Paz
Director of football: Edgardo Bauza
Sporting manager: Santiago Jácome

Coaching staff
Manager: Pablo Repetto
Assistant manager: Óscar Quagliatta, Franklin Salas
Physical trainer: Roberto Teixeira
Goalkeeper trainer: Luis Preti

Kits
Supplier: Puma
Sponsor(s): Banco Pichincha, Discover, Marathonbet, Pilsener, Roche (October/November)

Squad information

Note: Caps and goals are of the national league and are current as of the beginning of the season.

Winter transfers

Summer transfers

Competitions

Pre-season friendlies

Other friendlies 

Copa Alberto Spencer

Semi-finals

Finals

Serie A

The 2019 season is Liga's 58th season in the Serie A and their 18th consecutive. It is the first tournament organized by LigaPro.

First stage

Results summary

Results by round

Quarter-finals
Results summary

Results by round

Semi-finals
Results summary

Results by round

Finals
Results summary

Results by round

CONMEBOL Libertadores

L.D.U. Quito qualified to the 2019 CONMEBOL Libertadores—their 17th participation in the continental tournament—as Champions of the 2018 Serie A. They entered the competition in the group stage.

CONMEBOL Libertadores squad

1.Antonio Valencia replaced Jefferson Intriago for the Round of 16.
2.Luis Ayala replaced Djorkaeff Reasco for the Round of 16.
3.Luis Caicedo replaced Nicolás Freire for the Round of 16.
4. Juan Luis Anangonó left the club.
Source:

Group stage

Round of 16

Quarter-finals

Copa Ecuador

It's the first edition of the tournament. L.D.U. Quito entered the competition in the third stage.

Third Stage

Round of 16

Quarter-finals

Semi-finals

Finals

Player statistics

Note: Players in italics left the club mid-season.

Team statistics

References

External links
  

2019
Ecuadorian football clubs 2019 season